Blizzard of Souls can be:
Blizzard of Souls (novel), 1934 novel by Aleksandrs Grīns
Blizzard of Souls (film), 2019 film directed by Dzintars Dreibergs